In 1830, in the days before the outbreak of the July Revolution against the Bourbon Restoration in France, the conquest of Algeria was initiated by Charles X as an attempt to increase his popularity amongst the French people. The invasion began on 5 July 1830. Afterwards Algeria would become a territory within the French colonial empire from 1830 to 1962, under a variety of governmental systems.

List

(Dates in italics indicate de facto continuation of office)

French colony of Algeria (1830–1848) 
{| class="wikitable"
|- align=left
! Tenure
! Incumbent
! Notes
! width=50px|Portrait
|- valign=top
|5 July 1830 to 12 August 1830||Louis-Auguste-Victor, Count de Ghaisnes de Bourmont, Military Commander||||
|- valign=top
|12 August 1830 to 21 February/21 March? 1831|| Bertrand Clauzel, comte Clausel, Military Commander||1st term||
|- valign=top
|21 February/21 March 1831 to ?6/21 December 1831|| Pierre Berthezéne, Baron Berthezéne, Military Commander||||
|- valign=top
|?6/21 December 1831 to 29 April 1833||Anne Jean Marie René Savary, duc de Rovigo, Military Commander||||
|- valign=top
|29 April 1833 to 27 July 1834||Théophile Voirol, Baron Voirol, interim Military Commander||||
|- valign=top
|27 July 1834 to 8 July 1835||Jean-Baptiste Drouet, comte d'Erlon, Governor-General of the French Possessions in Africa||||
|- valign=top
|8 July 1835 to 12 February 1837||Bertrand, comte Clauzel, Governor-General of the French Possessions in Africa||2nd term||
|- valign=top
|12 February 1837 to 12/13 October 1837||Charles Marie Denys, comte de Damrémont, Governor-General of the French Possessions in Africa||Killed in combat during the siege of Constantine||
|- valign=top
|12/13 October 1837 to 11 November 1837||||
|- valign=top
|11 November/1 December 1837 to 18 December 1840||Sylvain Charles, comte Valée, Governor-General of the French Possessions in Africa||||
|- valign=top
|22 February 1841 to February 1842||Thomas Robert Bugeaud, Governor-General of the French Possessions in Africa||||rowspan="2"|
|- valign=top
|February 1842 to 27 September 1847||Thomas Robert Bugeaud, Governor-General of Algeria||
|- valign=top
|  1 September 1845 to 6 July 1847||  Louis Juchault de Lamoricière, acting Governor-General of Algeria||For Bugeaud||
|- valign=top
|  6 July 1847 to 27 September 1847||  Marie Alphonse Bedeau, acting Governor-General of Algeria||For Begeaud||
|- valign=top
|27 September 1847 to 24 February 1848||Henri-Eugène-Philippe-Louis d'Orleans, duc d'Aumale, Governor-General of Algeria||||
|- valign=top
|24 February 1848 to 29 April 1848||Louis-Eugène Cavaignac, Governor-General of Algeria||||
|- valign=top
|29 April 1848 to 9 September 1848||Nicolas Changarnier, Governor-General of Algeria||||
|- valign=top
|  20 June 1848 to 9 September 1848||  , acting Governor-General of Algeria||For Changarnier||
|- valign=top
|9 September 1848 to 4 November 1848||Viala Charon, Governor-General of Algeria||||
|- valign=top
|}

 French departments of Algeria (1848–1962) 

Shortly after the July Monarchy of Louis Philippe I was overthrown in the Revolution of 1848, the new government of the Second Republic ended Algeria's status as a colony and declared it in the 1848 Constitution an integral part of France. Three civil departements — Alger, Oran, and Constantine — were organized under a civilian government.

For continuation after independence, see: List of heads of state of Algeria

See also
 Ottoman Algeria
 List of Ottoman governors of Algiers
 French Algeria
 Pacification of Algeria
 Beylik of Tunis
 French protectorate of Tunisia
 List of French residents-general in Tunisia
 Kingdom of Tunisia
 French protectorate in Morocco
 List of French residents-general in Morocco

Sources
 http://www.rulers.org/rula1.html#algeria
 African States and Rulers, John Stewart, McFarland
 Heads of State and Government, 2nd Edition'', John V da Graca, MacMillan Press (2000)

French Governors
Governors
French Governors